This list of life sciences comprises the branches of science that involve the scientific study of life – such as microorganisms, plants, and animals including human beings. This science is one of the two major branches of natural science, the other being physical science, which is concerned with non-living matter. Biology is the overall natural science that studies life, with the other life sciences as its sub-disciplines.

Some life sciences focus on a specific type of organism. For example, zoology is the study of animals, while botany is the study of plants. Other life sciences focus on aspects common to all or many life forms, such as anatomy and genetics. Some focus on the micro-scale (e.g. molecular biology, biochemistry) other on larger scales (e.g. cytology, immunology, ethology, pharmacy, ecology). Another major branch of life sciences involves understanding the mindneuroscience. Life sciences discoveries are helpful in improving the quality and standard of life and have applications in health, agriculture, medicine, and the pharmaceutical and food science industries. For example, it has provided information on certain diseases which has overall aided in the understanding of human health.

Basic life science branches

 Biology – scientific study of life
 Anatomy – study of form and function, in plants, animals, and other organisms, or specifically in humans
 Astrobiology – the study of the formation and presence of life in the universe
 Bacteriology – study of bacteria
 Biotechnology – study of combination of both the living organism and technology
 Biochemistry – study of the chemical reactions required for life to exist and function, usually a focus on the cellular level
 Bioinformatics – developing of methods or software tools for storing, retrieving, organizing and analyzing biological data to generate useful biological knowledge
 Biolinguistics – the study of the biology and evolution of language.
 Biological anthropology – the study of humans, non-human primates, and hominids. Also known as physical anthropology.
 Biological oceanography- the study of life in the oceans and their interaction with the environment.
 Biomechanics – the study of the mechanics of living beings
 Biophysics – study of biological processes by applying the theories and methods that have been traditionally used in the physical sciences
 Botany – study of plants
 Cell biology (cytology) – study of the cell as a complete unit, and the molecular and chemical interactions that occur within a living cell
 Developmental biology – the study of the processes through which an organism forms, from zygote to full structure
 Ecology – study of the interactions of living organisms with one another and with the non-living elements of their environment
 Enzymology – study of enzymes
 Ethology – study of behavior
 Evolutionary biology – study of the origin and descent of species over time
 Evolutionary developmental biology – the study of the evolution of development including its molecular control
 Genetics – the study of genes and heredity
 Histology – the study of tissues
 Immunology – the study of the immune system
 Microbiology – the study of microscopic organisms (microorganisms) and their interactions with other living organisms
 Molecular biology – the study of biology and biological functions at the molecular level, some cross over with biochemistry, genetics, and microbiology
 Mycology – the study of fungi
 Neuroscience – the study of the nervous system
 Paleontology – the study of prehistoric organisms
 Parasitology - the study of parasites, their hosts, and the relationship between them.
 Pathology - the study of the causes and effects of disease or injury
 Pharmacology – the study of drug action
 Phycology – the study of algae
 Physiology – the study of the functioning of living organisms and the organs and parts of living organisms
 Population biology – the study of groups of conspecific organisms
 Quantum biology – the study of quantum phenomena in organisms
 Structural biology – a branch of molecular biology, biochemistry, and biophysics concerned with the molecular structure of biological macro-molecules
 Synthetic biology – the design and construction of new biological entities such as enzymes, genetic circuits and cells, or the redesign of existing biological systems
 Systems biology – the study of the integration and dependencies of various components within a biological system, with particular focus upon the role of metabolic pathways and cell-signaling strategies in physiology
 Theoretical biology – the use of abstractions and mathematical models to study biological phenomena
 Toxicology – the nature, effects, and detection of poisons
 Virology - the study of viruses like submicroscopic, parasitic particles of genetic material contained in a protein coat – and virus-like agents
 Zoology - the study of animals

Applied life science branches and derived concepts

 Agriculture - science, art and practice of cultivating plants and livestock
 Biocomputers – systems of biologically derived molecules, such as DNA and proteins, are used to perform computational calculations involving storing, retrieving, and processing data. The development of biological computing has been made possible by the expanding new science of nanobiotechnology.
 Biocontrol –  bioeffector-method of controlling pests (including insects, mites, weeds and plant diseases) using other living organisms.
 Bioengineering – the study of biology through the means of engineering with an emphasis on applied knowledge and especially related to biotechnology
 Bioelectronics – the electrical state of biological matter significantly affects its structure and function, compare for instance the membrane potential, the signal transduction by neurons, the isoelectric point (IEP) and so on. Micro- and nano-electronic components and devices have increasingly been combined with biological systems like medical implants, biosensors, lab-on-a-chip devices etc. causing the emergence of this new scientific field.
 Biomaterials – any matter, surface, or construct that interacts with biological systems. As a science, biomaterials is about fifty years old. The study of biomaterials is called biomaterials science. It has experienced steady and strong growth over its history, with many companies investing large amounts of money into the development of new products. Biomaterials science encompasses elements of medicine, biology, chemistry, tissue engineering and materials science.
 Biomedical science – healthcare science, also known as biomedical science, is a set of applied sciences applying portions of natural science or formal science, or both, to develop knowledge, interventions, or technology of use in healthcare or public health. Such disciplines as medical microbiology, clinical virology, clinical epidemiology, genetic epidemiology and  pathophysiology are medical sciences.
 Biomonitoring – measurement of the body burden of toxic chemical compounds, elements, or their metabolites, in biological substances. Often, these measurements are done in blood and urine.
 Biopolymer – polymers produced by living organisms; in other words, they are polymeric biomolecules. Since they are polymers, biopolymers contain monomeric units that are covalently bonded to form larger structures. There are three main classes of biopolymers, classified according to the monomeric units used and the structure of the biopolymer formed: polynucleotides (RNA and DNA), which are long polymers composed of 13 or more nucleotide monomers; polypeptides, which are short polymers of amino acids; and polysaccharides, which are often linear bonded polymeric carbohydrate structures.
 Biotechnology – manipulation of living matter, including genetic modification and synthetic biology
 Conservation biology – Conservation biology is the management of nature and of Earth’s biodiversity with the aim of protecting species, their habitats, and ecosystems from excessive rates of extinction and the erosion of biotic interactions. It is an interdisciplinary subject drawing on natural and social sciences, and the practice of natural resource management.
 Environmental health  – multidisciplinary field concerned with environmental epidemiology, toxicology, and exposure science.
 Fermentation technology – study of use of microorganisms for industrial manufacturing of various products like vitamins, amino acids, antibiotics, beer, wine, etc.
 Food science – applied science devoted to the study of food. Activities of food scientists include the development of new food products, design of processes to produce and conserve these foods, choice of packaging materials, shelf-life studies, study of the effects of food on the human body, sensory evaluation of products using panels or potential consumers, as well as microbiological, physical (texture and rheology) and chemical testing.
 Genomics – applies recombinant DNA, DNA sequencing methods, and bioinformatics to sequence, assemble, and analyze the function and structure of genomes (the complete set of DNA within a single cell of an organism). The field includes efforts to determine the entire DNA sequence of organisms and fine-scale genetic mapping. The field also includes studies of intragenomic phenomena such as heterosis, epistasis, pleiotropy and other interactions between loci and alleles within the genome. In contrast, the investigation of the roles and functions of single genes is a primary focus of molecular biology or genetics and is a common topic of modern medical and biological research. Research of single genes does not fall into the definition of genomics unless the aim of this genetic, pathway, and functional information analysis is to elucidate its effect on, place in, and response to the entire genome's networks.
 Health sciences – are those sciences which focus on health, or health care, as core parts of their subject matter. These two subject matters relate to multiple academic disciplines, both STEM disciplines, as well as emerging patient safety disciplines (such as social care research), and are both relevant to current health science knowledge.
 Immunotherapy – is the "treatment of disease by inducing, enhancing, or suppressing an immune response". Immunotherapies designed to elicit or amplify an immune response are classified as activation immunotherapies, while immunotherapies that reduce or suppress are classified as suppression immunotherapies.
 Kinesiology – Kinesiology, also known as human kinetics, is the scientific study of human movement. Kinesiology addresses physiological, mechanical, and psychological mechanisms. Applications of kinesiology to human health include: biomechanics and orthopedics; strength and conditioning; sport psychology; methods of rehabilitation, such as physical and occupational therapy; and sport and exercise. Individuals who have earned degrees in kinesiology can work in research, the fitness industry, clinical settings, and in industrial environments. Studies of human and animal motion include measures from motion tracking systems, electrophysiology of muscle and brain activity, various methods for monitoring physiological function, and other behavioral and cognitive research techniques.
 Medical device – A medical device is an instrument, apparatus, implant, in vitro reagent, or similar or related article that is used to diagnose, prevent, or treat disease or other conditions, and does not achieve its purposes through chemical action within or on the body (which would make it a drug). Whereas medicinal products (also called pharmaceuticals) achieve their principal action by pharmacological, metabolic or immunological means, medical devices act by other means like physical, mechanical, or thermal means.
 Medical imaging – Medical imaging is the technique and process used to create images of the human body (or parts and function thereof) for clinical or physiological research purposes
 Optogenetics – Optogenetics is a neuromodulation technique employed in neuroscience that uses a combination of techniques from optics and genetics to control and monitor the activities of individual neurons in living tissue—even within freely-moving animals—and to precisely measure the effects of those manipulations in real-time. The key reagents used in optogenetics are light-sensitive proteins. Spatially-precise neuronal control is achieved using optogenetic actuators like channelrhodopsin, halorhodopsin, and archaerhodopsin, while temporally-precise recordings can be made with the help of optogenetic sensors like Clomeleon, Mermaid, and SuperClomeleon.
 Pharmacogenomics – Pharmacogenomics (a portmanteau of pharmacology and genomics) is the technology that analyses how genetic makeup affects an individual's response to drugs. It deals with the influence of genetic variation on drug response in patients by correlating gene expression or single-nucleotide polymorphisms with a drug's efficacy or toxicity.
 Pharmacology –  Pharmacology is the branch of medicine and biology concerned with the study of drug action, where a drug can be broadly defined as any man-made, natural, or endogenous (within the body) molecule which exerts a biochemical and/or physiological effect on the cell, tissue, organ, or organism. More specifically, it is the study of the interactions that occur between a living organism and chemicals that affect normal or abnormal biochemical function. If substances have medicinal properties, they are considered pharmaceuticals.
 Population dynamics – Population dynamics is the study of short-term and long-term changes in the size and age composition of populations, and the biological and environmental processes influencing those changes. Population dynamics deals with the way populations are affected by birth and death rates, and by immigration and emigration, and studies topics such as ageing populations or population decline.
 Proteomics – Proteomics is the large-scale study of proteins, particularly their structures and functions. Proteins are vital parts of living organisms, as they are the main components of the physiological metabolic pathways of cells. The proteome is the entire set of proteins, produced or modified by an organism or system. This varies with time and distinct requirements, or stresses, that a cell or organism undergoes.

See also 
 Outline of biology
 Divisions of pharmacology
 Control theory

References

Further reading
 

 

Science-related lists
Life02
 Articles containing video clips